Guthrie–Edmond Regional Airport  is a public use airport in Logan County, Oklahoma, United States. The airport has been operated by both cities since 2005. It was formerly known as Guthrie Municipal Airport.

This airport is included in the National Plan of Integrated Airport Systems for 2017–2021, which categorized it as a general aviation facility.

Facilities and aircraft 
Guthrie–Edmond Regional Airport covers an area of 411 acres (166 ha) at an elevation of 1,069 feet (326 m) above mean sea level. It has one runway designated 16/34 with a concrete surface measuring 5,001 by 75 feet (1,524 x 23 m).

For the 12-month period ending September 28, 2011, the airport had 15,020 aircraft operations, an average of 41 per day: 99.9% general aviation and 0.1% military. At that time there were 115 aircraft based at this airport: 78% single-engine, 11% multi-engine, 6% jet, 4% helicopter, and 1% ultralight.

References

External links 
 
 Guthrie–Edmond Regional Airport (GOK) at Oklahoma Aeronautics Commission
 Aerial image as of April 1991 from USGS The National Map
 

Airports in Oklahoma
Buildings and structures in Logan County, Oklahoma
Guthrie, Oklahoma